Riccardo Cocciante (born 20 February 1946), also known in French-speaking countries and the U.S. as Richard Cocciante, is an Italian singer, composer, theatre man and musician. He acquired French citizenship.

Personal life 
Cocciante was born on 20 February 1946 in Saigon, French Indochina, now Ho Chi Minh City, Vietnam, to an Italian father from Rocca di Mezzo, L'Aquila, and a French mother. At the age of 11, he moved to Rome, Italy, where he attended the Lycée français Chateaubriand. He has also lived in France, the United States, and Ireland.

Career 
Cocciante began achieving success as a musician around 1972. In 1976, he covered the Beatles song "Michelle" for the musical documentary All This and World War II. That same year, he released his sole English album in the US, with the single "When Love Has Gone Away" peaking at No. 41 on the Billboard Hot 100.

In 1983, Cocciante signed to Virgin Records as their first Italian artist.

In 1991, he won the Sanremo Festival with the song "Se stiamo insieme", and for Christmas 1997, his friend Plácido Domingo invited him to sing at Domingo's annual Christmas in Vienna concert, together with Sarah Brightman and Helmut Lotti.

In 1996, he was chosen as the singer for the Italian versions of the songs in the Toy Story movie, singing "Un Amico in me", "Che Strane Cose" and "Io non-volerò più".

As of 2008, Cocciante has had three musicals running, including Giulietta e Romeo (musical), Le Petit Prince, and Notre-Dame de Paris. His most recent project, the Chinese language adoption of Giacomo Puccini's opera Turandot is being directed by Zhang Yimou.

In 2013, Cocciante was a coach for The Voice Italy. Elhaida Dani, one of the contestants he coached, won the first season of The Voice Italy.

Sincerità and other foreign-language releases 
Cocciante's oeuvre includes recordings in Italian, French, English, and Spanish. In 1976, he released a cover of The Beatles' song "Michelle", featuring the London Symphony Orchestra. Cocciante recorded his hit song "Pour Elle" as a duet with Francesca Bellenis with English lyrics. The song is part of his 1994 album "Un uomo felice". A Spanish version "Por Ella" and an Italian version "Per Lei" were also recorded. In 1983, Cocciante released his album "Sincerità", produced and arranged by the American composer James Newton Howard.

Discography
 Mu (1972)
Poesia  (1973)
Anima  (1974)
L'alba  (1975)
Richard Cocciante [English version of Anima] (1976)
Concerto per Margherita (1976)
Riccardo Cocciante  (1978)
...E io canto (1979)
Cervo a primavera  (1980)
Q Concert (1981)
Cocciante (1982)
Sincerità (1983)
Il mare dei papaveri (1985)
Quando si vuole bene (1986)
La grande avventura (1988)
Viva! (1988)
Cocciante (also known as Se stiamo insieme; 1991)
Empreinte (1993)
Eventi e mutamenti  (1993)
Il mio nome è Riccardo (1994)
Un Uomo Felice (1994)
 Je Chante (1995)
Innamorato (1997)
Istantanea (1998)
Notre-dame de Paris live Arena di Verona  (2002)
Songs (2005)

Musicals
Notre-Dame de Paris (1997; lyrics by Luc Plamondon)
Le Petit Prince (2002; lyrics by Elizabeth Anais)
Giulietta e Romeo (2007; lyrics by Pasquale Panella)

References

External links 

 RICCARDO COCCIANTE Official Web Site
 Biography of Richard Cocciante, from Radio France Internationale
 Biography of Riccardo Cocciante, from RAI International
AyerHoy.com (Cada día un perfil de un artista del ayer)

 

Cocciante, Riccardo
Cocciante, Riccardo
Cocciante, Riccardo
Cocciante, Riccardo
French male singers
French people of Italian descent
Italian people of French descent
Sanremo Music Festival winners
Italian musical theatre composers
French musical theatre composers
People from Ho Chi Minh City
20th-century Italian composers
21st-century Italian composers
20th-century French composers
21st-century French composers
20th-century French male musicians
21st-century French male musicians